Mauritius requires its residents to register their motor vehicles and display vehicle registration plates.

References

Mauritius
Transport in Mauritius
Mauritius transport-related lists